To the Nameless Dead is the sixth studio album by the Irish black metal band Primordial, released in 2007. It is also available in a limited edition as a digibook, featuring a different cover design, a 40-page booklet, and a bonus DVD. The album was recorded at Foel Studio, Wales, with producer Chris Fielding. It was recorded using all analog equipment and using mostly first or second takes for the final recording, making for a more raw and spontaneous sound.

To The Nameless Dead received virtually universal and overwhelming praise, rising to such accolades as being named 2008's Metal Album of the Year by Chronicles of Chaos (continuing an unprecedented back to back honoring for Primordial by the webzine).

Track listing

Credits
 A.A. Nemtheanga – Vocals, mastering, mixing
 Ciáran MacUiliam – Guitars
 Michael O'Floinn – Guitars
 Pól MacAmlaigh – Bass
 Simon O'Laoghaire – Drums

References

2007 albums
Primordial (band) albums
Metal Blade Records albums